The Ōrere River is a river of the Auckland Region of New Zealand's North Island. It flows generally northeast from the Hunua Ranges, reaching the Firth of Thames at Ōrere Point, close to the point where the firth widens into the Hauraki Gulf / Tīkapa Moana.

The New Zealand Ministry for Culture and Heritage gives a translation of "place of the waterfall" for Ōrere.

See also
List of rivers of New Zealand

References

Rivers of the Auckland Region
Rivers of New Zealand
Firth of Thames
Hauraki Gulf catchment